Saidapur is a village in Saidapur mandal of Karimnagar district in the state of Telangana in India, near Huzurabad.

See also
Jagirpally

References 

Villages in Karimnagar district
Mandal headquarters in Karimnagar district